Rusanivka (translit.: Rusanovka) is a man-made island and neighbourhood surrounded by a canal, the Rusanivs'kyi Kanal. The canal is an artificial distributary of the Dnieper River. The river and canal make the neighborhood resemble an island. The island is located in the left-bank part of Kyiv, the capital of Ukraine. It is surrounded by such neighborhoods like Hidropark, Darnytsia, Berezniaky, and Livoberezhnyi masyv.

Overview

Closer to the river, Rusanivka has a couple small beaches. The neighbourhood has many apartment buildings, most are which are 9 to 16 stories tall. There are many stores and cafés on the Rusanivs'ka Naberezhna, the main street in Rusanivka.

Lacking industry, Rusanivka was conceived from the start as a purely residential neighbourhood according to the Soviet concept of allocating the so-called sleeping districts (dormitory neighbourhoods) in large industrial cities. It was envisaged, during creation of this neighbourhood, that the area would be served by two main types of public transportation — buses and river boats on Dnieper and canal – so private cars would not be necessary for the residents. The river boats would have created a Venice-like atmosphere in the area. In reality, mass transit based on river boats proved uneconomical and was discontinued. But this loss has been compensated for by a fleet of buses and trolleybuses which locals can reach right from the island. Besides, the Rusanivka Embankment has been recently renovated and attracts both the residents of the island and surrounding neighbourhoods to take a walk or have dinner at a local cafe. One can try anything from European to Asian to Greek cuisine there.

The island is also known for its dancing fountains at the canal open from spring till autumn every year.

External links
  Русанівка in Wiki-Encyclopedia Kyiv
 kievphoto.org.ua Photos of Rusanivka

Neighborhoods in Kyiv
Dniprovskyi District, Kyiv
River islands of Ukraine
Islands of the Dnieper